The Tasmanian Land Conservancy (TLC) is a non-profit, non governmental organisation that acquires and manages land in Tasmania, Australia, protecting important natural places for biodiversity conservation. As at January 2016, TLC had reportedly protected , and was a $30 million organisation.

However, most of the reserves remain in private ownership, with covenants to hold them for conservation. Ecosystems in covenanted areas include grasslands, woodlands, heath and saltmarsh.

TLC receives funding from the Australian federal government, and private donations from supporters of particular sites or projects such as protecting birds.

One of the organisation's founding volunteers, Jane Hutchinson, was nominated as 2016 Australian of the Year for her leadership as a board member, chair of the board and chief executive officer from 2011.

See also
Protected areas of Tasmania

References

External links
Tasmanian Land Conservancy - Official website

Non-profit organisations based in Tasmania
Organizations established in 2001
Nature conservation in Australia